Aizac is a commune in the Ardèche department in the Auvergne-Rhône-Alpes region of southern France.

The inhabitants of the commune are known as Aizacois or Aizacoises

Geography
Aizac is located some 30 km east of Langogne and 40 km west of Livron-sur-Drome close to the Monts d'Ardeche Regional Nature Park. Access to the commune is difficult with only three circuitous roads entering the commune. From Vals-les-Bains in the south the D578 goes north then left to the D243 which eventually comes close to the western border of the commune where there is a right turn to the D443 which enters the commune and joins the D254 at the village. The D254 road enters the commune from Labastide-sur-Besorgues in the north-west and continues through the commune exiting on the eastern side intersecting with the D578 which goes north and south. Other than small mountain roads no other roads enter the commune. The village is very small with only a few houses and there are a few other houses scattered through the commune.

There are many streams throughout the commune such as the Ruiseau des Fuels, the Bise, the Coupe, the Rousses, the Ribeyres, and the Sandron most of which flow to the Ardeche river in the south.

Neighbouring communes and towns

Administration

List of Successive Mayors of Aizac

Population

Distribution of Age Groups

The population of the town is relatively old.

Percentage Distribution of Age Groups in Aizac and Ardèche Department in 2017

Source: INSEE

Sites and Monuments
 Remains of Aizac volcano
 A Romanesque Church from the 11th  century including a baptistry and font. The church has several items that are registered as historical objects:
A Statue: Saint Roch (18th century)
A Statue: Virgin and child (18th century)
An Altar (19th century)
A Stoup (17th century)
A Baptismal font (18th century)

See also
 Communes of the Ardèche department

References

External links

Aizac on Géoportail, National Geographic Institute (IGN) website 
Ayzac on the 1750 Cassini Map

Communes of Ardèche
Vivarais